Paul Desenne (Caracas (Venezuela), 7 December 1959) is a Venezuelan cellist and composer, whose composition style fuses elements from native Latin American and European music.

Early life
Desenne grew up in Caracas and played in the Simón Bolívar Youth Orchestra. He went on to study composition for 11 years in Paris.

Performance
Desenne's main instrument is the cello. He won first prize in cello performance at the Conservatoire National Supérieur de Paris.

Composition
In 2002 Desenne took a break from teaching and performance to concentrate on composition. Desenne's works have been performed in major venues around the world, including Alice Tully Hall at the Lincoln Center for the Performing Arts and Joan and Sanford I. Weill Recital Hall at Carnegie Hall. On 4 September 2016  Desenne's work Hipnosis mariposa was premiered at The BBC Proms by Simón Bolívar Symphony Orchestra conducted by Gustavo Dudamel.

Desenne's "unique compositional style" exhibits a "musical hybridization" of influences from European classical music and indigenous Latin American traditions. "His works, though easily classified as art music, nevertheless gain much of their emotional and referential meaning through this rich borrowing."

Fellowships and positions
In 2006 Desenne became a Fellow at Civitella Ranieri Center in Umbria, Italy, and was awarded a Guggenheim Fellowship in 2009. During 2010-11 he was a Fellow at the Radcliffe Institute, Harvard University.

He has been resident composer with FESNOJIV (El Sistema) in Venezuela. He writes a weekly column on music for the Venezuelan national newspaper El Nacional.  he is Composer in Residence with the Alabama Symphony Orchestra.

Works
Desenne has written instrumental music for cello, flute, and combinations of instruments, and is writing an opera based on the story of coffee cultivation.

 Gurrufío for flute orchestra (1997)
 Solo Flute Sonata (2001) 
 "Jaguar Songs" (2002), a sonata for solo cello
 "The Two Seasons of the Caribbean Tropics" (2003), a violin concerto
 Guasa Macabra for flute and clarinet (2003)
 Sinfonía Burocratica ed’Amazzonica (2004), a "tropical symphony in five movements"
 Palenkumbé (2007), an overture incorporating Latin rhythms and folk songs
 Gran Cacelorazo (2010), a piece for piano, percussion, and strings
 La Revoltosa, two chamber works for clarinet
 Hipnosis Mariposa (2014)
 "Life of Benjamin: a Monkey Symphony" (2015)
 Symphony No. 5 (2016)
Guasamacabra for orchestra (2018)

References

External links
 Paul Desenne page.

21st-century classical composers
Venezuelan composers
Cellists
1959 births
Living people
21st-century cellists